The women's 800m T53 event at the 2008 Summer Paralympics took place at the Beijing National Stadium on 15 September. There were no heats in this event.

Final

Competed at 17:50.

DNS = Did not start.

References
 
 

W
2008 in women's athletics